Damhustorvet is a larger traffic hub and small business district in south-eastern Rødovre, immediately before the border to Copenhagen. It is served by 8 bus lines, and has two supermarkets, pizzeria, a bicycle store, an outdoor shop, butcher, bakery, convenience store, barber, real estate agent, a kebab parlor and lastly a motorcycle dealership.

The area is located adjacent to Damhussøen and Roskildevej. It is served by bus lines 6A, 13, 21, 22, 132 and 93N.

Shopping centres in Denmark
Buildings and structures in the Capital Region of Denmark